Voice of Israel was a Jerusalem-based private global broadcast network staffed by media professionals with a Zionist and often religious orientation, who saw their mission in pro-Israel advocacy (hasbara) and combating the global pro-Palestinian Boycott, Divestment and Sanctions movement, by addressing the wider Jewish diaspora. It streamed digital news and talk radio between 2014-2015, at Voice of Israel | Bringing Israel Closer, from Israel, about Israel, in English. Voice of Israel began broadcasting in July 2014 and was closed down due to lack of money in August 2015. Voice of Israel was listened to in more than 170 countries and gained over 40,000 "likes" on Facebook in less than a year. It was located in the JVP Media Quarter in Jerusalem.

"Voice of Israel" is not to be confused with Kol Yisrael (lit. "Voice of Israel" in Hebrew), which is run by the Israel Broadcasting Authority.

Orientation
The station had a national Zionist orientation, the self-declared goal being to "reveal the real Israel" as a "Jewish state with great sensitivity to other cultures and peoples" and "fight [its] deligitimization".

The self-professed mission was to 'Bring Israel Closer' to millions of people around the world: To repair the disconnect between Israel and the diaspora: To educate and inform the world on all issues Israel, including politics, defense, religion and culture by providing world-class news, analysis and opinion and feature stories, about Israel, from Israel.

Notable guests
Notable guests included: Prime Minister Benjamin Netanyahu, Tzipi Livni - Opposition Leader, Isaac Herzog - Opposition Leader, Baruch Marzel - far right activist, formerly of the outlawed Kach party and currently with the Jewish National Front, internationally acclaimed novelist A. B. Yehoshua, Michael Oren - former Israeli Ambassador to the US and, as of 2015, a member of the Knesset, Jon Medved - CEO of OurCrowd, Yosef Abramowitz - solar pioneer, CEO of Energia, Ben Carson - US Presidential candidate, Brigitte Gabriel - political activist, Rudy Giuliani - former New York Mayor, Mike Huckabee -  Presidential candidate, Bishop Merton Clark - Truth Revealed International, Avi Dichter - former head of Shin Bet and Minister of Internal Security, Moshe Arens - former Defense Minister and Ambassador to US, Tuvia Tenenbom - author of Catch the Jews!, David Parsons - International Christian Embassy Jerusalem, Pastor Jonathan Hanson - World Ministries International, Natan Sharansky - Jewish Agency Chairman, Malcolm Hoenlein - Executive Vice Chairman of the Conference of Presidents of Major American Jewish Organizations, Rabbi Shmuley Boteach - influential author, columnist, TV host, and lecturer, Governor Mike Pence - State of Indiana, Jerry Silverman - Jewish Federations of North America (JFNA), CEO, Philip Levine - mayor of Miami Beach, Florida, Dr. Billy Wilson - President of Oral Roberts University.

Talk show hosts from abroad also teamed up with Voice of Israel to broadcast their programs such as Ethan Bearman and Joe Piscopo.

Staff
The station was led by Bureau Chief Daniel Seaman, CEO Glen Ladau, and Executive Producer Dan Diker.

Show hosts include: Mottle Wolfe, Daniel Seaman, Josh Hasten, Judy Lash Balint, Eve Harow, Daniela Traub, Glen Ladau, Molly Livingstone, former Member of Knesset Dov Lipman, Melanie Phillips, Gil Hoffman, Ari Abramowitz, Jeremy Gimpel, Dan Diker, Yishai Fleisher, Simcha Gluck 

The news team included Mordechai Twersky, Raoul Wootliff and Ernie Singer.

References

External links 

 Voice of Israel web site archived pages

Radio stations in Israel